The 1994–95 National Professional Soccer League season was the eleventh season for the league.

League standings

American Division

National Division

Playoffs

Scoring leaders

GP = Games Played, G = Goals, A = Assists, Pts = Points

League awards
 Most Valuable Player: Hector Marinaro, Cleveland
 Defender of the Year: Sean Bowers, Detroit
 Rookie of the Year: Henry Gutierrez, Cleveland
 Goalkeeper of the Year: Jamie Swanner, St. Louis
 Coach of the Year: Zoran Savic, Kansas City

All-NPSL Teams

All-NPSL Rookie Teams

References
Major Indoor Soccer League II (RSSSF)

1994 in American soccer leagues
1995 in American soccer leagues
1994-95